(born August 31, 1981) is a professional Go player.

Biography
Atsushi turned professional in 1999 and was promoted to 2 dan in the same year. In 2004, Atsushi was awarded a prize for having the highest winning percentage among Japanese professionals. His record was 27 wins and 9 losses, totaling to a 75% win ratio. In the same year he reached his 200th career win. Atsushi participated in the 10th Samsung Cup in 2005 as a Japan representative.

References

External links
 Nihon Ki-in profile 

1981 births
Japanese Go players
Living people